The 1782 Mendoza earthquake took place in the province of Mendoza, Argentina, on 22 May 1782, at about 4 PM (UTC-3). It had an estimated magnitude of 7.0 in the Richter scale.

This was the first documented earthquake of many which would affect the provincial capital of Mendoza since its foundation. It was felt with grade VIII (Severe) on the Mercalli intensity scale, and damaged several buildings, but did not produce casualties.

See also
1920 Mendoza earthquake

References
 Instituto Nacional de Prevención Sísmica. Listado de Terremotos Históricos. 

1782
Mendoza, 1782
1782 in the Spanish Empire